Verticordia subg. Eperephes is a botanical name for a grouping of similar plant species in the genus Verticordia. This subgenus contains six sections, classifying forty four species, of Alex George's infrageneric arrangement. The subgeneric name is derived from the Greek word eperephes, in reference to over-hanging parts at the hypanthium which differentiate the contained species from the other two subgenera.

Verticordia subg. Eperephes
Section Integripetala
Section Tropica
3 species, the type species for this section is Verticordia cunninghamii. These are outliers that extend the range of the genus to the Northern Territory
Section Jamiesoniana
containing a single species; Verticordia jamiesonii
Section Verticordella
containing 18 species
Section Corynatoca
containing a single species; Verticordia ovalifolia
Section Pennuligera
the lectotype chosen for this section is Verticordia grandis

References

 

Eperephes
Plant subgenera